Colette Irwin-Knott is an American academic administrator. She served as the interim president of Valparaiso University from September 1, 2020 to February 28, 2021.

Biography
Irwin-Knott graduated from Valparaiso University in 1981 with a bachelor of science degree. She worked in public finance in Indianapolis, Indiana, until her retirement in 2014. Irwin-Knott has served on the Valparaiso University Board of Directors since 2009.

References

External links
Valpo profile

Presidents of Valparaiso University
American academic administrators
People from Indiana
Year of birth missing (living people)
Living people